Edmund, Earl of Lancaster and Earl of Leicester (16 January 12455 June 1296) nicknamed Edmund Crouchback was a member of the House of Plantagenet. He was the second surviving son of King Henry III of England and Eleanor of Provence. In his childhood he had a claim on the Kingdom of Sicily; however, he never ruled there. He was granted all the lands of Simon de Montfort in 1265, and from 1267 he was titled Earl of Leicester. In that year he also began to rule Lancashire, but he did not take the title Earl of Lancaster until 1276. Between 1276 and 1284 he governed the counties of Champagne and Brie with his second wife, Blanche of Artois, in the name of her daughter Joan, and he was described in the English patent rolls as earl of Lancaster and Champagne. His nickname, "Crouchback", may be a corruption of 'crossback' and refer to his participation in the Ninth Crusade.

Life
Edmund was born in London, a son of Henry III of England and Eleanor of Provence. He was a younger brother of Edward I, Margaret, and Beatrice, and an elder brother of Catherine.

He was invested ruler of the Kingdom of Sicily by the Bishop of Bologna in 1255, on behalf of Pope Alexander IV. In return, his father undertook to pay the papacy 135,541 marks and fight a war to dislodge the Hohenstaufen king Manfred. Henry's barons refused to contribute to what they called the "Sicilian business", and ultimately Henry was only able to pay 60,000 marks. Steven Runciman says the grant of the kingdom was revoked by Pope Alexander IV on 18 December 1258; Baines and Harland state that this occurred in 1263, under Pope Urban IV.

However, Edmund soon obtained important possessions and dignities, for soon after the forfeiture of Simon de Montfort, 6th Earl of Leicester on 25 October 1265, Edmund received the Earldom of Leicester and later that of Lancaster. He was granted the honour of the Stewardship of England and the lands of Nicolas de Segrave. He also acquired the estates of Robert de Ferrers, 6th Earl of Derby, which included the Honour of Hinckley Castle.

In 1267, Edmund was granted lands in Lancashire and Wales including the royal demesne lands in Lancashire, and the lordships of Lancaster, Three Castles, and Monmouth (the latter two in Wales). After the civil war in 1267, he was appointed High Sheriff of Lancashire. Henry III created his second son Earl of Leicester in 1267, granting the honour and privileges of that city. The following year he was made Constable of Leicester Castle, a royal possession in the king's name. Crouchback by now had a reputation as a ruthless and ferocious warrior, but he was not in England fighting de Montfort.

In 1271, Edmund accompanied his elder brother Edward on the Ninth Crusade to Palestine. Although taking a different route to the Holy Land, Edmund is recorded as being in Savoy on 16 August 1271. Some historians, including the authors of the Encyclopædia Britannica article on him, state that it was because of this that he received the nickname 'Crouchback' (meaning "cross-back"), indicating that he was entitled to wear a cross, stitched into the back of his garments. If this is true, his nickname does not mean "hunched-back".

Edmund remained loyal to his brother, Edward I; the Charter grants of 1265, 1267, and 1268–9 were confirmed by the King in a document of Inspeximus in 1284, and by Parliament in the Great Charter of Leicester. Also in 1284, on the marriage of his stepdaughter, he renounced the title of Earl of Champagne, although he continued in possession of his wife's dowerlands. Edmund frequently acted as an ambassador abroad. He was sent as Governor of Ponthieu in 1291, on behalf of his second wife, Blanche of Artois.

His duty to the church included the foundation of a Nuns of Clara or Poor Clares nunnery at Minories, St Aldate's. In 1291, his estate paid for the establishment for the Chapel of Savoy, in memory of his mother, near St Clement Danes. Filial piety was part of the chivalric code of an honourable knight. Edmund was a generous benefactor to the monastery of Grace Dieu in Leicestershire, and to the nuns at Tarrant Crawford. He also helped establish a major Greyfriars monastery at Preston in the duchy of Lancaster.

In 1281, he supervised the construction of Aberystwyth Castle for King Edward I to subjugate the Welsh. The following year Edmund accompanied Roger Mortimer on the campaign against Llywelyn, defeating and capturing the prince.

In 1294 the French king, Philip IV, through trickery, defrauded King Edward out of his lands in Gascony. Edward immediately began to plan an invasion but ran into difficulties. First, some of the Welsh rebelled against him, then the Scots rebelled. Finally, by the end of 1295, he was ready to take up the conflict with Philip. He wanted to send Edmund to lead a small force ahead of the main army he was gathering, but Edmund fell ill in that autumn and was unwell until Christmas. Finally, Edmund was able to go to Bordeaux for his brother. Amongst the nobles was the Earl of Lincoln and 26 banneret knights. During the siege of Bayonne the English ran out of money, so the army melted into the countryside. Broken-hearted, the warrior-prince Edmund Crouchback died on 5 June. His body was carried to England and was interred on 15 July 1296 at Westminster Abbey, London.

Family
Edmund married firstly on 8 April 1269 Aveline de Forz, daughter of William de Forz, 4th Earl of Albemarle and Isabella de Fortibus, Countess of Devon. She died four years later aged just 15 and was buried at Westminster Abbey. The couple had no children, although some sources believe she may have died in childbirth or shortly after a miscarriage.

He married secondly on 3 February 1276 Blanche of Artois, in Paris, widow of King Henry I of Navarre, and daughter of Robert I of Artois and Matilda of Brabant. With Blanche he had three children:

 Thomas, 2nd Earl of Lancaster (born circa 1278, executed 22 March 1322)
 Henry, 3rd Earl of Lancaster (born circa 1281, died 22 September 1345)
 John of Lancaster (born bef. May 1286, died in France shortly bef. 13 June 1317), seigneur of Beaufort in Champagne (now Montmorency-Beaufort, Aube, arrondissement d'Arcis-sur-Aube, canton de Chavanges) and of Nogent-l'Artaud (Aisne, arrondissement de Château-Thierry, canton de Charly), France. Before July 1312, he married Alix de Joinville, widow of Jean d'Arcis, seigneur of Arcis-sur-Aube and Chacenay (died in or before 1307), and daughter of Jean de Joinville, seigneur de Joinville (Haute-Marne, arrondissement Vassy, ch.-I. canton), Seneschal of Champagne, by his second wife, Alix, daughter and heiress of Gautier, seigneur of Reynel. He died without issue. Three generations later the legitimated issue of John of Gaunt, 1st Duke of Lancaster (husband of Blanche of Lancaster, younger daughter and eventual sole heiress of Henry of Grosmont, 1st Duke and 4th Earl of Lancaster) adopted the surname "de Beaufort" after this possession of the Earls of Lancaster, thus founding the House of Beaufort.

Ancestry and family

Notes

External links
 Inquisition Post Mortem
 Tomb monument with effigy of Prince Edmund "Crouchback", Earl of Lancaster at Westminster Abbey

References
W.E. Rhodes, "Edmund, Earl of Lancaster", English Historical Review, x (1895)
 R. Somerville, History of the Duchy of Lancaster, i, 1953

Lancaster, Edmund Crouchback, 1st Earl of
Lancaster, Edmund Crouchback, 1st Earl of
13th-century English nobility
13th-century English Navy personnel
Burials at Westminster Abbey
Edmund Crouchback
Lancaster, Edmund Crouchback, 1st Earl of
1st Earl of Leicester
Lancaster, Edmund Crouchback, 1st Earl of
Lancaster, Edmund Crouchback, 1st Earl of
Lancaster, Edmund Crouchback, 1st Earl of
High Sheriffs of Lancashire
Children of Henry III of England
Earls of Lancaster
Military personnel from London
Sons of kings